FIFA Football 2003, known as FIFA Soccer 2003 in North America, and simply FIFA 2003 is a football simulation video game produced by Electronic Arts and released by EA Sports. It was released in 2002.

FIFA 2003 is the tenth game in the FIFA series and the eighth to be produced in 3D.

Gameplay 
A number of new features were added to improve upon the previous version. Club Championship Mode was introduced with the feature of playing against 17 of Europe's top clubs in their own stadiums and the fans singing their unique chants and songs. A TV-style broadcast package gives highlights at half-time and full-time, as well as comprehensive analysis. One of the most anticipated new features was EA Sport's "Freestyle Control" which allows the user to flick the ball on and lay it off to team mates. Other additions include greater likenesses of some of the more well-known players such as Thierry Henry and Ronaldinho, as well as realistic player responses.

Players 
The European cover features Roberto Carlos, Ryan Giggs, and Edgar Davids, representing Brazil, Manchester United and Juventus respectively. In the United States, Landon Donovan appeared on the cover alone.

Reception 

Upon release, FIFA 2003 was initially outsold by Pro Evolution Soccer 2 (PES2) in October 2002, but FIFA 2003 later overtook PES by December 2002, when FIFA had sold  copies across Europe. The PlayStation 2 version of FIFA Football 2003 received a "Double Platinum" sales award from the Entertainment and Leisure Software Publishers Association (ELSPA), indicating sales of at least 600,000 copies in the United Kingdom.

The game received "generally favorable reviews" on all platforms except the PlayStation version, which received "average" reviews, according to the review aggregation website Metacritic. FIFA Football 2003 was a runner-up for GameSpots annual "Best Sports Game on PC" award, which went to Madden NFL 2003.

References

External links 
 FIFA 2003 website
 

2002 video games
Electronic Arts games
EA Sports games
Association football video games
2
Game Boy Advance games
GameCube games
Mobile games
PlayStation (console) games
PlayStation 2 games
Video games developed in Canada
Windows games
Xbox games
Video games set in 2002
Video games set in 2003
La Liga licensed video games
Exient Entertainment games
Multiplayer and single-player video games